The four-vertex theorem of geometry states that the curvature along a simple, closed, smooth plane curve has at least four local extrema (specifically, at least two local maxima and at least two local minima). The name of the theorem derives from the convention of calling an extreme point of the curvature function a vertex. This theorem  has many generalizations, including a version for space curves where a vertex is defined as a point of vanishing torsion.

Definition and examples
The curvature at any point of a smooth curve in the plane can be defined as the reciprocal of the radius of an osculating circle at that point, or as the norm of the second derivative of a parametric representation of the curve, parameterized consistently with the length along the curve. For the vertices of a curve to be well-defined, the curvature itself should vary continuously, as happens for curves of smoothness . A vertex is then a local maximum or local minimum of curvature. If the curvature is constant over an arc of the curve, all points of that arc are considered to be vertices. The four-vertex theorem states that a smooth closed curve always has at least four vertices.

An ellipse has exactly four vertices: two local maxima of curvature where it is crossed by the major axis of the ellipse, and two local minima of curvature where it is crossed by the minor axis. In a circle, every point is both a local maximum and a local minimum of curvature, so there are infinitely many vertices.

Every curve of constant width has at least six vertices. Although many curves of constant width, such as the Reuleaux triangle, are non-smooth or have circular arcs on their boundaries, there exist smooth curves of constant width that have exactly six vertices.

History
The four-vertex theorem was first proved for convex curves (i.e. curves with strictly positive curvature) in 1909 by Syamadas Mukhopadhyaya. His proof utilizes the fact that a point on the curve is an extremum of the curvature function if and only if the osculating circle at that point has fourth-order contact with the curve; in general the osculating circle has only third-order contact with the curve.  The four-vertex theorem was proved for more general curves by Adolf Kneser in 1912 using a projective argument.

Proof
This is a circle that contains the given curve and has the smallest possible radius. If the curve includes an arc of the circle, it has infinitely many vertices. Otherwise, the curve and circle must be tangent at at least two points, because a circle that touched the curve at fewer points could be reduced in size while still enclosing it. At each tangency, the curvature of the curve is greater than that of the circle, for otherwise the curve would continue from the tangency outside the circle rather than inside. However, between each pair of tangencies, the curvature must decrease to less than that of the circle, for instance at a point obtained by translating the circle
until it no longer contains any part of the curve between the two points of tangency and considering the last point of contact between the translated circle and the curve. Therefore, there is a local minimum of curvature between each pair of tangencies, giving two of the four vertices. There must be a local maximum of curvature between each pair of local minima (not necessarily at the points of tangency), giving the other two vertices.

Converse
The converse to the four-vertex theorem states that any continuous, real-valued function of the circle that has at least two local maxima and two local minima is the curvature function of a simple, closed plane curve.  The converse was proved for strictly positive functions in 1971 by Herman Gluck as a special case of a general theorem on pre-assigning the curvature of n-spheres. The full converse to the four-vertex theorem was proved by  shortly before his death in January 1998, and published posthumously.  Dahlberg's proof uses a winding number argument which is in some ways reminiscent of the standard topological proof of the Fundamental Theorem of Algebra.

Application to mechanics
One corollary of the theorem is that a homogeneous, planar disk rolling
on a horizontal surface under gravity has at least 4 balance points. A discrete version of this is that there cannot be a monostatic polygon.
However, in three dimensions there do exist monostatic polyhedra, and there also exists a convex, homogeneous object with exactly 2 balance points (one stable, and the other unstable), the Gömböc.

Discrete variations
There are several discrete versions of the four-vertex theorem, both for convex and non-convex polygons. Here are some of them:
 (Bilinski) The sequence of angles of a convex equilateral polygon with at least four vertices has at least four extrema.
 The sequence of side lengths of a convex equiangular polygon with at least four sides has at least four extrema.
 (Musin) A circle circumscribed around three consecutive vertices of a polygon with at least four vertices is called extremal if it contains all remaining vertices of the polygon, or has none of them in its interior.  Such a convex polygon is generic if it has no four vertices on the same circle. Then every generic convex polygon with at least four vertices has at least four extremal circles.
 (Legendre–Cauchy) Two convex n-gons with equal corresponding side length have either zero or at least 4 sign changes in the cyclic sequence of the corresponding angle differences.
 (A.D. Alexandrov) Two convex n-gons with parallel corresponding sides and equal area have either zero or at least 4 sign changes in the cyclic sequence of the corresponding side lengths differences.

Some of these variations are stronger than the other, and all of them imply the (usual) four-vertex theorem by a limit argument.

Generalizations to space curve
The stereographic projection from the once-punctured sphere to the plane preserves critical points of geodesic curvature. Thus simple closed spherical curves have four vertices. Furthermore, on the sphere vertices of a curve correspond to points where its torsion vanishes. So for space curves a vertex is defined as a point of vanishing torsion. Every simple closed space curve which lies on the boundary of a convex body has four vertices. This theorem can be generalized to all curves which bound a locally convex disk.

See also
Last geometric statement of Jacobi
Tennis ball theorem

References

Theorems in differential geometry
Theorems in discrete geometry
Theorems about curves
Polygons